Thompson Creek is a stream in Lewis and Thurston counties in the U.S. state of Washington.It is a tributary to the Skookumchuck River. Its source is in Lewis County and its mouth is in Thurston County.

The namesake of Thompson Creek has not been identified.

References

Rivers of Lewis County, Washington
Rivers of Thurston County, Washington
Rivers of Washington (state)